Akhenaten: Son of the Sun is a novel written by Moyra Caldecott in 1986. It was first published in 1986 as The Son of the Sun in hardback by Allison & Busby, UK.

Plot introduction
Based on the remarkable reign of Akhenaten in Eighteenth Dynasty Egypt, this story is told as if by a contemporary of his, Djehuti-kheper-Ra. It follows history as closely as possible on the evidence we have, and describes the political machinations of the time. But it also traces the spiritual journey of the protagonists, the journey on which we are all engaged whether we know it or not.

Akhenaten: Son Of The Sun is part of Moyra Caldecott’s Egyptian sequence, which also includes Hatshepsut: Daughter of Amun and Tutankhamun and the Daughter of Ra. Chronologically, Akhenaten: Son of the Sun takes place between the other two books, but it was written first.

Plot summary

The story begins with the suffering of a boy oracle, or medium, about to be sealed alive into a pyramid chamber for three days so that he may "astral-travel" to the realms of the gods and plead for the waters of the Nile to rise, bringing life-giving silt to the farmlands. The story follows him through his lonely despair until he becomes the honoured companion of a king and an important figure in an extraordinary revolution.

At this time the high priests of the god Amun, brought to prominence by the female pharaoh Hatshepsut about a century before, are rich and powerful enough to challenge a king...

Characters in "Akhenaten: Son of the Sun"
Akhenaten – the main protagonist
Nefertiti – his queen
Djehuti-kheper-Ra – the narrator

Release details
1986, UK, Alison & Busby , Pub date 12 June 1986, Hardback (as The Son of the Sun)
1987, USA, Knopf Publishing Group ?, Pub date ? ? 1987, Hardback (as The Son of the Sun)
1990, UK, Arrow Books Limited , Pub date 18 January 1990, 1st paperback edition (with revisions)
1998, UK, Bladud Books , Pub date 1 June 1998, paperback as a print on demand
2001, UK, Mushroom Ebooks , Pub date ? May 2001, ebook
2003, UK, Mushroom Ebooks , Pub date ? ? 2003, ebook

1986 British novels
Novels set in ancient Egypt
Novels set in the 14th century BC
Cultural depictions of Akhenaten